Violacein is a naturally-occurring bis-indole pigment with antibiotic (anti-bacterial, anti-viral, anti-fungal and anti-tumor) properties. Violacein is produced by several species of bacteria, including Chromobacterium violaceum, and gives these organisms their striking purple hues. Violacein shows increasing commercially interesting uses, especially for industrial applications in cosmetics, medicines and fabrics.

Biosynthesis

Violacein is formed by enzymatic condensation of two tryptophan molecules, requiring the action of five proteins. The genes required for its production, vioABCDE, and the regulatory mechanisms employed have been studied within a small number of violacein-producing strains. Production of violacein is controlled by quorum sensing using acyl-homoserine lactones (AHLs).

Only a few genera of bacteria have been reported to produce violacein. These include Chromobacterium, Duganella, Pseudoalteromonas, Janthinobacterium, Iodobacter, Rugamonas, and Massilia.

Antibiotic activity
Violacein is known to have diverse biological activities, including as a cytotoxic anticancer agent and antibacterial action against Staphylococcus aureus and other gram-positive pathogens. Determining the biological roles of this pigmented molecule has been of particular interest to researchers, and understanding violacein's function and mechanism of action is relevant to potential applications. Commercial production of violacein and related compounds has proven difficult so improving fermentative yields of violacein is being pursued through genetic engineering and synthetic biology.

References

Further reading 

 

Indoles
Antibiotics
Secondary metabolites